Mozart group may refer to:

 Mozart Group, a private military company
 MozART group, a cabaret and comedy string quartet